Hassell National Park is a national park in the Great Southern region of Western Australia,  southeast of Perth and  north east of Albany.

Named after John Hassell, a retired sea captain, who was responsible for opening up extensive areas in the south of the state during the 1850s as he extended his pastoral leases east from Frankland as far as Jerramungup.

The park straddles the South Coast Highway between Manypeaks and Wellstead.

The site is regarded as an important ecological area as a result of it being a largely intact vegetation and wildlife corridor that serves to link the Mount Manypeaks and Waychinicup areas with the Cheynes Baech and Pallinup areas.

The park has no entry fee and has no facilities provided for visitors.

A population of the very rare Brown's Banksia, composed of 100 to 200 plants, can be found within the confines of the park.

See also
 Protected areas of Western Australia

References 

National parks of Western Australia
Great Southern (Western Australia)
Protected areas established in 1971
1971 establishments in Australia
Jarrah Forest